In mathematics, an invertible sheaf is a coherent sheaf S on a ringed space X, for which there is an inverse T with respect to tensor product of OX-modules. It is the equivalent in algebraic geometry of the topological notion of a line bundle. Due to their interactions with Cartier divisors, they play a central role in the study of algebraic varieties.

Definition

An invertible sheaf is a locally free sheaf S on a ringed space X, for which there is an inverse T with respect to tensor product of OX-modules, that is, we have 

isomorphic to OX, which acts as identity element for the tensor product. The most significant cases are those coming from algebraic geometry and complex geometry. For spaces such as (locally) Noetherian schemes or complex manifolds, one can actually replace 'locally free' by 'coherent' in the definition.

The invertible sheaves in those theories are in effect the line bundles appropriately formulated. In fact, the abstract definition in scheme theory of invertible sheaf can be replaced by the condition of being locally free of rank 1. That is, the condition of a tensor inverse then implies, locally on X, that S is the sheaf form of a free rank-1 module over a commutative ring. Examples come from fractional ideals in algebraic number theory, so that the definition captures that theory. More generally, when X is an affine scheme Spec(R), the invertible sheaves come from projective modules over R, of rank 1.

The Picard group

Quite generally, the isomorphism classes of invertible sheaves on X themselves form an abelian group under tensor product. This group generalises the ideal class group. In general it is written

with Pic the Picard functor. Since it also includes the theory of the Jacobian variety of an algebraic curve, the study of this functor is a major issue in algebraic geometry.

The direct construction of invertible sheaves by means of data on X leads to the concept of Cartier divisor.

See also
 Vector bundles in algebraic geometry
 Line bundle
 First Chern class
 Picard group
 Birkhoff-Grothendieck theorem

References
Section 0.5.4 of 

Geometry of divisors
Sheaf theory